Ultraman or Ultra Series is a collective name for all media featuring the Ultraman character.

Ultraman may also refer to:

Film and television
Ultraman (1966 TV series), tokusatsu television series
Ultraman (1967 film), a 1967 Japanese tokusatsu kaiju film 
Ultraman (1979 film), a 1979 Japanese tokusatsu kaiju film
Ultraman (2004 film), a 2004 tokusatsu superhero film

Anime
 The Ultraman, 1979 Japanese animated television series
 Ultraman (2019 anime), Japanese animated television series

Comics
 Ultraman (DC Comics), any one of several DC Comics supervillainous counterparts of Superman
 Ultraman (manga), a 2010s spin-off sequel manga of the 1960s TV series
 Ultra-Man, a Golden Age of comic books superhero from All-American Publications

Other uses
Ultraman (character), the Japanese tokusatsu character from the Ultraman series
 Ultraman (band), a punk rock band
 Ultraman (endurance challenge), an endurance sporting event
 Ultraman (video game), a 1994 fighting game based on the 1993 TV series
 Ultraman (wrestler) (born 1947), Mexican professional wrestler
 Ultraman, Andrew's secret identity from My Secret Identity
 Starman (wrestler) (born 1974), Mexican professional wrestler who previously worked as "Ultraman Jr."

See also